Canada–Norway relations are foreign relations between Canada and Norway.

As NATO allies and multilateral partners, Canada and Norway have had a long history of cooperation on regional and global terror issues, such as the War in Afghanistan. As of 2017, Canada and Norway have had diplomatic relations for 75 years.

History 
The very first Europeans to reach North America were Norsemen, who made at least one major effort at settlement at L'Anse aux Meadows in Newfoundland around 1000 AD. Snorri Thorfinnsson, or Snorri Guðriðsson, was the son of Thorfinn Karlsefni and his wife Guđriđ. He is thought to be the first European baby born in North America.

On May 29, 1914, in the middle of the night, the Norwegian cargo ship  and the Canadian passenger liner  collided. Unfortunately, While Storstad did not sink, Empress of Ireland went down to the bottom of the St. Lawrence River, taking 1,012 lives with her, and 465 to survive. In the end, both parties were to blame.

Little Norway was a Norwegian Army Air Service/Royal Norwegian Air Force training camp in Canada during World War II. Camp Norway in Lunenburg, Nova Scotia was the naval training camp.

During the Cold War, Canadian troops were stationed in Norway as part of the NATO alliance.  The Canadian Air-Sea Transportable Brigade Group was assigned to reinforce Norway in the case of a general war in Europe.

Diplomatic ties
Canada has an embassy in Oslo and a consulate in Bergen. Norway has an embassy in Ottawa and four consulates-general in Calgary, Montreal, Toronto and Vancouver, as well as honorary consuls in most provincial capitals.

Both countries are full members of the Arctic Council, of the Organization for Security and Co-operation in Europe, of NATO and of the Organisation for Economic Co-operation and Development.

Past immigration
There are 433,000 people of Norwegian descent living in Canada.

See also 
 Foreign relations of Canada 
 Foreign relations of Norway
 Embassy of Canada in Oslo
 Embassy of Norway in Ottawa
 Canadians of Norwegian descent

References

External links 
  Canadian Ministry of Foreign Affairs and International Trade about relations with Norway
  Canadian embassy in Oslo
  Norwegian embassy in Ottawa 

 
Norway 
Bilateral relations of Norway